The Service de police de la Ville de Québec (French for Quebec City Police Service) is the municipal police force of Quebec City, Quebec, Canada, and the neighbouring municipalities in the urban agglomeration of Quebec City.

History
Quebec has had some level of policing since 1651, but a modern force was not established until 1843 under the leadership of Robert Henry Russell.

The current force was created from the merger of five separate police forces into the existing Quebec City police force in 2002.

Operations
SPVQ operations consists of four stations covering 6 Boroughs:

There are plans to reduce the number of stations to two:

 consolidate stations serving La Cité-Limoilou, Les Rivières, Charlesbourg, Beauport and La Haute-Saint-Charles into one station out from Lebourgneuf with a smaller sub station l'édifice F.-X. Drolet de Saint-Roch serving the city centre.
 Sainte-Foy–Sillery–Cap-Rouge would maintain a dedicate station.

Organization

Ranks:

 Chief of Police/Director
 Associate Director
 inspector
 Capitain
 Lieutenant
 Sergeant/
 Constable

List of directors and chiefs of police
1843 - 1858 : Robert Henry Russell
1858 - 1866 : Jean-Baptiste Bureau
1880 - 1895 : Léon P. Vohl
1903 - 1936 : Émile Trudel
1938 - 1942 : Adolphe-Stephen Thomas dit Bigaouette (1887-1942)
1950 - 1965 : Roger Lemire
1965 : Aimé Guillemette
1965 - 1968 : Gérard Girard
1968 - 1972 : Joseph-Alphonse Matte
1973 - 1980 : Jean-Charles Vanhoutte
1980 - 1985 : Robert Vézina
1985 - 1996 : Normand Bergeron
1997 - 2001 : Alexandre Matte
2001 - 2006 : Daniel Langlais
2007 - 2011 : Serge Bélisle
2011 - 2016 : Michel Desgagné
2016 - 2021 : Robert Pigeon
2021 -      : Denis Turcotte

See also
 Service de protection contre les incendies de Québec

References

External links
 Le Service de police de la Ville de Québec

Quebec
Municipal government of Quebec City